Xosé Manoel Núñez Seixas (born 1966) is a Spanish historian who specializes in nationalism studies, the cultural history of war and violence, and migration studies.

Biography 
Born in Ourense, Galicia, in 1966, he studied at the University of Santiago de Compostela (USC) and in Dijon. He earned a PhD in contemporary history from the European University Institute (EUI) in 1992, reading a dissertation titled El problema de las nacionalidades en la Europa de entreguerras: El Congreso de Nacionalidades Europeas (1925-1938) supervised by Heinz-Gerhard Haupt and Stuart J. Woolf Senior lecturer at the USC since 1994, he obtained a chair of contemporary history at the USC in 2007. Following a hiatus as full professor of Modern European History at the Ludwig Maximilian University of Munich from 2012 to 2017, he returned to his post at the USC. Since July 2018, he is vice-president of the Council of Galician Culture (Consello da Cultura Galega). Fluent in several European languages, he is also a member of the editorial board of the history journals Historia Social and Passato e Presente, as well as member of the International Advisory Board of European History Quarterly, Ayer, Anuario del IEHS, Estudos Iberoamericanos, Spagna Contemporanea and Historia y Política, among others.

Works 

Author
 
 
 
 
 
 
 
 
 
 
 
 
 
 
 
 Die bewegte Nation. Der spanische Nationalgedanke, 1808-2019, Hamburg: Hamburger Edition, 2019 (reprint: Bonn: Bundeszentrale für politische Bildug, 2020).
 Sites of the Dictators. Memories of Authoritarian Europe, 1945-2020, London: Routledge, 2021.
 Imperios e danzas. As Españas plurais do franquismo, Vigo: Galaxia, 2021.
 Volver a Stalingrado. El frente del este en la memoria europea, 1945-2021, Barcelona: Galaxia Gutenberg,2022.
Editor & co-editor
Co-author
 
 
 
 
 
 
 {{Cite book|title=War Veterans and the World after 1945. Cold War Politics, Decolonization, London: Routledge, 2019.
 {{Cite book|title=Emotions and Everyday Nationalism in Modern Europe, London: Routledge, 2020.
 {{Cite book|title=The First World War and the Nationality Question in Europe. Global Impact and Local Dynamics, Leiden/Boston: Brill, 2020.

References 
Informational notes

Citations

Bibliography

External links 
 

Academic staff of the University of Santiago de Compostela
Academic staff of the Ludwig Maximilian University of Munich
21st-century Spanish historians
1966 births
European University Institute alumni
Scholars of nationalism
Living people